The Bank of Eritrea is the central bank of Eritrea.  The bank is located in Asmara, the capital.  The central bank is interested in encouraging foreign investment and in importing capital goods such as industrial machinery and agricultural equipment. The Central Bank of Eritrea, though a government entity, is independent from the Ministry of Finance; its governor and policy committee formulate and implement policy with input from the Ministry of Finance. Although travellers are permitted to bring foreign currency into the country, all transactions are to be made in Nakfa.

Governors
Andebrhan Welde Giorgis, 1993-1994
Tekie Beyene, 1994-2003-?
Kibreab Woldemariam, ?-2004-

See also
Banking in Eritrea
Central banks and currencies of Africa
Economy of Eritrea
Eritrean nakfa, the unit of currency
List of central banks

References

External links 

 

Economy of Eritrea
Eritrea
Organisations based in Asmara
1914 establishments in Eritrea
Banks established in 1914
Banks of Eritrea
Banking in Eritrea